The Blue Room (La chambre bleue) is a 1923 oil-on-canvas painting by French artist Suzanne Valadon. One of her most recognizable works, it has been called a radical subversion of the traditional female nude in art. Like many of Valadon's later works, it uses strong colors and emphasizes decorative backgrounds and patterned materials.  Valadon uses these techniques among others to create a full portrayal of her female subject relevant to her social era—moving her value away from solely being related to her physical attributes. As a whole, Valadon's artistic decisions create an image of a modern 20th century woman—contrasting the depictions created by her predecessors and leaving a legacy for future female artists.

The painting is in the Musée National d'Art Moderne, Centre Georges Pompidou in Paris. When it was exhibited in a Valadon exhibition at the Barnes Foundation in Philadelphia (September 26, 2021 – January 9, 2022) it was pictured on the cover of the exhibition catalog, and a reviewer of the exhibition called the painting the "showpiece" of the exhibition.

Description

Although the painting mimics the likeness of traditional nude forms, it emphasizes a different perception of the modern, 20th-century woman. The woman, seen relaxing atop a bed or draped couch in front of a mural or headboard, is not nude; she wears casual loungewear consisting of striped green pajamas, a pink and strapped tank top, and bare feet. She is curvaceous and the use of "a combination of colors and a strong black outline" gives her a sense of liveliness as she looks off towards the left side of the piece while an unlit cigarette hangs from her red lips—painted with lipstick which compliments her casual hair pulled into a bun. The woman's surroundings are also quite casual. From a stack of books near her feet to the delicate floral swirls adorning the covers of the bed (or couch), the setting gives a different context to the display of beauty. The form, attire, and setting gives off an unreserved relatability. Instead of an overtly beautiful depiction of the female figure with visuals of breasts, flowing hair, or a grand, natural setting, it subverts the male oriented, idealized female figure for one grounded in the real world.

Social circumstances 
The stylistic decisions can be seen as a display of Valadon's view of society's changing social norms. The piece was created in a revolutionary time when gender roles and female independence came to the forefront of social discussion in Paris and elsewhere. After WWI, women's placement in society as objects to be escorted by men, fashioned by men, and overall constricted by men began to be replaced with a new kind of woman. Women began to make various strides in regards to fashion and social norms: wearing shorter, loose-fitting dresses, shorter bobbed hair, taking up traditionally male smoking habits, and purposefully pursuing education. Through Valadon's artistic decisions, she exemplifies the 20th-century woman as having more character unrelated to the previous male gaze. While her figure is the subject, the intimacies of her body are replaced by the intimacies of her unedited or unpolished living experience.

Subversion of established techniques 

In contrast to Valadon's depiction of the female form, artists such as Titian, Ingres, and Manet depicted female nudes with idealized womanly features. For example, the Grand Odalique, Olympia, and Venus of Urbino underscore a gendered role of women with full female exposures atop beds—as something separate from the model—creating an imbalanced power dynamic between the artists and subject. The Blue Room is a response to these paintings as well as others, such as Matisse's Blue Nude and Félix Vallotton's The White and the Black. Substituting a cigarette for Ingres's hookah and taking Matisse's bold outlines, among other traits from the aforementioned works, Valadon creates a "startlingly contemporary" lounger, capturing a depiction of everyday life which is entirely her own. Valadon's subversion and appropriation of her predecessor's techniques ultimately instigate a new trajectory for future depictions of the female form.

Legacy 
With the pioneering and groundbreaking depiction of the female form by Valadon through the subversion of her predecessor's techniques, The Blue Room can be seen as the starting point for a long lasting legacy for female artists.  As Janet Burns notes in “Looking as Women: The Paintings of Suzanne Valadon, Paula Modersohn-Becker, and Frida Kahlo”, “given the bias of western culture to fetishizing the female body, the nude is a difficult genre for women artists. It is enshrined as an icon of culture that epitomizes and objectifies female sexuality.” After Valadon, many younger, female artists were inspired by her realistic depiction of the female form through stylistic decisions and embraced the autonomy promoted by the revolutionary art style.

References

External links
 Includes image of the painting

Paintings by Suzanne Valadon
1923 paintings
Paintings in the collection of the Musée National d'Art Moderne
Books in art